General Forster or Förster may refer to:

Albert Forster (1902–1952), German SS lieutenant general
Helmuth Förster (1889–1965), German Luftwaffe general
John Forster (British Army officer) (1856–1938), British Army major general
William Forster (British Army officer) (1798–1879), British Army general
Otto-Wilhelm Förster (1885–1966), German Wehrmacht general

See also
James Forrester (politician) (1937–2011), North Carolina Air National Guard brigadier general
Michael Forrester (1917–2006), British Army major general